The Oweegee Range is a small subrange of the Skeena Mountains of the Interior Mountains, located on the east side of Bell-Irving River in northern British Columbia, Canada.

Mountains
Mountains within the Oweegee Range include:

Mount Skowill
Delta Peak
Mount Klayduc

References

Oweegee Range in the Canadian Mountain Encyclopedia

Skeena Mountains